Tinputz Rural LLG is a local-level government (LLG) of the Autonomous Region of Bougainville, Papua New Guinea. The Tinputz language is spoken in the LLG.

Wards
01. Tinputz
02. Teop
03. Taonita

References

Local-level governments of the Autonomous Region of Bougainville